The Willows are a Canadian musical trio based in Toronto, Ontario, made up of Andrea Gregorio, Lauren Pedersen, and Krista Deady.
According to Raul da Gama of Toronto Music Report the trio have a "a vocal configuration similar to the legendary Andrews Sisters."

Origins
All three members grew up together in Edmonton, Alberta, and went to college together in Toronto.
They met taking ballet in Edmonton at age nine.
They attended the Edmonton Dance Centre from age twelve onward.
They were all accepted to Ryerson University in 2008 to study dance.
While there, they formed the trio in 2010, before graduating with Bachelor of Fine Arts dance degrees in 2012.

Musical career
The sound of the Willows is described as classic jazz with mucho swing.

This is Christmas
The debut album, This is Christmas, was released in 2015.  
It mainly featured covers of popular Christmas songs, but also included a few original works.

Tee for Three
The Willows released their second full length album, Tee for Three, in 2017.
Most of the writing for the album was done by Lauren Pedersen and Chris Graham.
This was their first album featuring all-original tunes.

References

External links

Living people
Canadian girl groups
Canadian musical trios
Musical groups from Edmonton
Musical groups from Toronto
Vocal trios
Year of birth missing (living people)